Corematodus taeniatus is a species of haplochromine cichlid endemic to Lake Malawi, Lake Malombe and the upper Shire River in East Africa. It is a generalized aggressive mimic of various sand-dwelling cichlids. It is therefore able to approach unsuspecting schools of these species and rapidly take a mouthful of scales or fin.

References

taeniatus
Taxa named by Ethelwynn Trewavas
Fish described in 1935
Taxonomy articles created by Polbot